

Gustav von Vaerst (19 April 1894 – 10 October 1975) was a German general during World War II.

He was the last commander of the 5th Panzer Army, which was trapped in Northern Tunisia, between 28 February and 9 May 1943. He surrendered with his army to the British and Americans and was held in captivity until his release in 1947.

References

Bibliography

1894 births
1975 deaths
People from Meiningen
People from Saxe-Meiningen
Generals of Panzer Troops
German Army personnel of World War I
Recipients of the clasp to the Iron Cross, 1st class
Recipients of the Knight's Cross of the Iron Cross
German prisoners of war in World War II held by the United Kingdom
Reichswehr personnel
Military personnel from Thuringia
German Army generals of World War II